Chonotrichia is a subclass of phyllopharyngeid ciliates. These single-celled organisms are sessile at maturity and usually live on crustaceans as ectosymbionts.

References

Phyllopharyngea